Adenostemma zakii is a species of flowering plant in the family Asteraceae. It is endemic to Ecuador. Its natural habitat is subtropical or tropical moist montane forests.  It is threatened by habitat loss.

References

zakii
Endemic flora of Ecuador
Vulnerable plants
Taxonomy articles created by Polbot